Alfred Lücker (29 March 1931 – 22 December 2008) was a German field hockey player who competed in the 1952 Summer Olympics and in the 1956 Summer Olympics.

References

External links
 

1931 births
2008 deaths
German male field hockey players
Olympic field hockey players of Germany
Olympic field hockey players of the United Team of Germany
Field hockey players at the 1952 Summer Olympics
Field hockey players at the 1956 Summer Olympics
Olympic bronze medalists for the United Team of Germany
Olympic medalists in field hockey
Medalists at the 1956 Summer Olympics
20th-century German people